Bob Rock Jr. (born October 17, 1949) is an American luger. He competed in the men's singles event at the 1972 Winter Olympics.

References

1949 births
Living people
American male lugers
Olympic lugers of the United States
Lugers at the 1972 Winter Olympics
Sportspeople from Missoula, Montana